is a Japanese voice actress who is affiliated with Aoni Production. On December 24, 2012, she started using the stage name Chiko.

Filmography

Television animation
Dragon Ball Z (Hatch)
Mooretsu Atarou (Atarou)
Romeo's Blue Skies (Leo)

Theatrical animation
Dragon Ball Z: Bojack Unbound (Zangya)
Kimagure Orange Road: The Movie (Horikoshi)
Mobile Suit Gundam: Char's Counterattack (Anna)
Sailor Moon R: The Movie (Fiore as a child)

OVA
Ariel (Nami)
Ariel Deluxe (Yuki Nishijima)
Birdy the Mighty (Hazumi Senkawa)
Ellcia (Shin Shin)
Karura Mau (Kayoko)
Mobile Suit Gundam 0080: War in the Pocket (Chay)
Shamanic Princess (Apoline)
Ushio & Tora (Tatsuya)

Video games
Dragon Ball Z: Budokai Tenkaichi 2 (Zangya)

External links
Tomoko Maruo profile at Aoni Production 

1966 births
Living people
Voice actresses from Yokohama
Japanese voice actresses
20th-century Japanese actresses
21st-century Japanese actresses
Aoni Production voice actors